The Gediz shemaya (Alburnus battalgilae) is a species of ray-finned fish in the genus Alburnus. It is endemic to the Gediz River and Koca River drainages in Turkey. It is threatened by water extraction and agricultural pollution.

References

battalgilae
Endemic fauna of Turkey
Fish described in 2007
Taxa named by Müfit Özuluǧ
Taxa named by Jörg Freyhof
Vulnerable animals